The Aki River (also, the Akikawa River) is a river in Japan. The Aki River flows west of Tokyo Metropolitan Area. It is a major tributary of the Tama River, The Japanese name, 秋川, means "Autumn River."

The words Akigawa River sound a bit odd, as kawa and gawa, 川, are Japanese words for river, so Aki River makes more sense, or simply Akigawa, perhaps Akikawa.

The river's source

The Akigawa has a north fork and a south fork, but the river's source is in the Chichibu Tama Kai National Park.

Course of the river

The Akigawa flows through the towns of Akiruno and Hinohara, and through Kanagawa and Tokyo Prefectures.

Recreation area

The river's gorge is a popular recreation area.

See also

 Akigawa Station

References

External links and references

 On recreation in the Akigawa
 More recreation
 More recreation
 On its gorge
 Photos
 A Youtube
 A second Youtube
 A third Youtube, people playing in the Akigawa
 The river's Facebook page

 
 
 
 
Rivers of Japan